Slingerland is a Dutch toponymic surname. It refers to an origin in the heerlijkheid of Slingelandt, now covered by the former community of Nederslingeland and the town of Overslingeland in South Holland. Variants are (Van) Slingeland and Slingelandt.  Many Americans named Slingerland are descendants of Dutch settler Teunis Cornelis Slingerland (1617, Amsterdam – 1700, Hackensack, New Jersey). Notable people with the name include:

 Cashandra Slingerland (born 1974), South African road cyclist
 H.H. Slingerland (1875–1946), American founder of the Slingerland Drum Company
  (1834–1874), American politician, vice governor of Nevada from 1867 to 1871
 Jared Slingerland (born 1984), Canadian guitarist and electronic musician
 John I. Slingerland (1804–1861), United States Representative from New York
Van Slingeland(t)
Cornelis van Slingeland (1635–1686), Dutch portrait painter
Pieter Cornelisz van Slingelandt (1640–1691), Dutch portrait painter
Simon van Slingelandt (1664–1736), Grand Pensionary of Holland from 1727 to 1736

See also
 Slingerland Drum Company
 Slingerlands, New York, a hamlet named for the post master William H. Slingerland

References

Dutch-language surnames
Toponymic surnames